Robert Bruce, 1st Earl of Ailesbury (later styled Aylesbury) and 2nd Earl of Elgin, PC, FRS (ca. March 1626 – 20 October 1685), was a Scottish politician who sat in the House of Commons from 1660 to 1663, when he inherited his father's title as Earl of Elgin.

Life
Robert Bruce was the son of Thomas Bruce, 1st Earl of Elgin by his first wife, Anne Chichester. His portrait, as "Lord Kinloss" at the age of 9 was painted by Cornelius Johnson. He went on a Grand Tour in Europe in the years 1642 to 1646.

During his father's lifetime, Lord Bruce, as he was styled, was Member of Parliament for Bedfordshire in the Convention Parliament in 1660 and the Cavalier Parliament in 1661, until he succeeded to his father's titles, becoming the 2nd Earl of Elgin in 1663. The following year, he was created Earl of Ailesbury on 18 March 1664, as well as Viscount Bruce of Ampthill and Baron Bruce of Skelton, for his services in procuring the English Restoration. He was Lord Lieutenant of Bedfordshire from 1660 with the Earl of Cleveland, and solely, from 1667 to his death.

In October 1678, Lord Ailesbury was invested as a Privy Counsellor (PC) and a Gentleman of the Bedchamber. He was Lord Lieutenant of Cambridgeshire and Hampshire from 1681 to his death. In 1685, he was invested as a Fellow of the Royal Society and Lord Chamberlain on 30 July 1685.

Robert Bruce died in 1685, aged 58, at Houghton House, just north of Ampthill, Bedfordshire, and was buried on 26 October of that year, at Maulden. His widow, the Dowager Countess of Ailesbury, built Ampthill House nearby in 1686, originally as a dower house. By this time, the Bruce family had extensive estates, among them were: Whorlton Castle, West Tanfield, Manfield, and Clerkenwell Priory.

Marriage and progeny

Robert Bruce married Lady Diana Grey, daughter of Henry Grey, 1st Earl of Stamford and Lady Anne Cecil, on 16 February 1645. They had seventeen children, nine of whom seem to have survived to adulthood:
Hon. Edward Bruce (b. 1644/5, d. 1662)
Thomas Bruce, 2nd Earl of Ailesbury (b. 1656, d. 16 December 1741)
Hon. Henry Bruce (b. 1656?, d. young)
Lady Diana Bruce (d. 15 July 1672), married firstly, Sir Seymour Shirley, 5th Baronet, on 29 January 1666; married secondly, on 10 November 1671, John Manners, Lord Roos, who became Duke of Rutland after her death.
Lady Mary Bruce (b. 31 December 1657, bur. 15 May 1711), married Sir William Walter, 2nd Baronet.
Lady Christiana (or Christian) Bruce (b.1658), married firstly, on 4 June 1677 at Ampthill, John Rolle (d.1689), eldest son and heir apparent of Sir John Rolle of Stevenstone, Devon (d.1706), with whom she had two sons, Robert Rolle (c.1677-18 November 1710) and John Rolle (1679–1730); married secondly, Sir Richard Gayer (or Geyer/Gere) of Stoke Poges, Buckinghamshire.
Lady Anne Bruce (1st Anne, b. ca. 1660, d. before 1717), married Sir William Rich, 2nd Baronet in 1672.
Hon. Robert Bruce (1st Robert?, d. 1652)
Hon. Charles Bruce (d. 1661)
Hon. Bernard (or Barnard) Bruce (b. 1666, d. 1669)
Lady Arabella Bruce (d. young)
Lady Anne Charlotte Bruce (2nd Anne, d. 13 March 1713), married Sir Nicholas Bagenal of Newry, a grandson of Henry Bagenal.
Lady Henrietta Bruce, married Thomas Ogle.
Hon. Robert Bruce (2nd Robert?, d. 1728)
Hon. James Bruce (d. 1738)
Lady Christian Bruce (2nd Christian?, d. young).
Lady Elizabeth Bruce (d. young).

Notes

References

External links
Website with information about the Ailesbury Mausoleum at Maulden

|-

|-

|-

1626 births
1685 deaths
2
Robert
Robert
Fellows of the Royal Society
Lord-Lieutenants of Bedfordshire
Lord-Lieutenants of Cambridgeshire
Lord-Lieutenants of Huntingdonshire
Members of the Privy Council of England
English MPs 1660
English MPs 1661–1679
Robert